Gümüşhacıköy District is a district of Amasya Province of Turkey. Its seat is the town Gümüşhacıköy. Its area is 629 km2, and its population is 22,179 (2021).

Composition
There is one municipality in Gümüşhacıköy District:
 Gümüşhacıköy

There are 44 villages in Gümüşhacıköy District:

 Akpınar
 Alören
 Aşağıovacık
 Bacakoğlu
 Bademli
 Balıklı
 Beden
 Çalköy
 Çavuşköy
 Çetmi
 Çiftçioğlu
 Çitli
 Derbentobruğu
 Doluca
 Dumanlı
 Eslemez
 Güllüce
 Güplüce
 Güvemözü
 İmirler
 Kağnıcı
 Karaali
 Karacaören
 Karakaya
 Keçiköy
 Kılıçaslan
 Kırca
 Kızık
 Kızılca
 Kiziroğlu
 Koltuk
 Konuktepe
 Korkut
 Köseler
 Kutluca
 Kuzalan
 Ovabaşı
 Pusacak
 Sallar
 Saraycık
 Sarayözü
 Sekü
 Yazıyeri
 Yeniköy

References

Districts of Amasya Province